Miguel Benasayag (born in Buenos Aires on 4 June 1953) is a philosopher, psychoanalyst, epistemology researcher and former Franco-Argentinian Guévariste resistance fighter. He is close to the left-libertarian movement.

Biography
Miguel Benasayag was born in Argentina, into a family he describes as "intellectual Jews".  He studied medicine in Argentina at the same time as he fought for the Guévariste guerillas.

Arrested three times, he fell the third time, was tortured, then having survived, he spent four years in prison. Following the murder of two French nuns by the junta, Benasayag was able to benefit, thanks to his dual Franco-Argentinian nationality (his French mother had left France in 1939), from the program for the release of French prisoners in Argentina and to surrender thus in France in 1978, a country he did not know. He asserts that his release would have been the subject of a bargaining negotiated by Maurice Papon for the purchase by Argentina of French weapons.

In France, he married in 1982, has two children, he continued for a time his militant guerrilla activity. He then became a researcher, clinician and activist in the "new radicalism".

Visiting professor at the Faculty of Medicine of Buenos Aires, chair of epistemology. In 1987, he defended a thesis in clinical human sciences at the University of Paris VII: On the subject in political prisons, psychoanalytic study of the subject-discourse relationship in a borderline situation, under the supervision of the philosopher and sociologist Pierre Ansart. In 2001, he obtained an HDR (habilitation to direct research) in Montpellier in Anthropology and Sociology. The subject was the eruption of uncertainty in the hard sciences and the humanities. Visiting professor at the University of Lille 3. Directs the "social laboratorios" in Argentina.

He participated in the Popular University of the City of 4000, at La Courneuve. He coordinates the popular university of Ris Orangis. He coordinates the "de-psychiatrization" program in Brazil at Fortaleza. Benasayag has been running the Campo Biologico theoretical biology laboratory in Buenos Aires since 2008. He acts as a weekly columnist on Radio Nacional Argentina.

He is the author in 1999 of the Manifesto of the alternative resistance network. From 2003 to 2007, he coordinated research on the experience of Médecins du Monde's methadone bus. In 2007, in France, he supported the candidacy of José Bové for the presidential election and signed a petition for the release of former members of Action Direct.

Between 2010 and 2018, he worked with Lavaca, a social cooperative located in Buenos Aires (Argentina) which is developing significant research activity in the social and scientific fields. In France, in Amiens, he co-hosts the Art & Epoque laboratory with the Compagnie du Théâtre Useless. Since 2005, he has also been working in Florence (Italy), within the framework of a monthly research seminar organized with COOP and the Italian cooperative movement.

In 2010, he wrote for La Mèche and signed a column for the five of Villiers le bel after the riots of 2007 calling for the overthrow of the police qualified as "occupation army". For Philippe Bilger, this forum "does not even relate to the extreme left nor to a sulphurous leftism", but aims "at nothing less than to legitimize attempted murder".

He is a member of the Support Committee of the Primo Levi Center (care and support for victims of torture and political violence).

Since 2020, he has been heading the Organisms and Artefacts: Transformations in the Biological and Anthropological Field laboratory as part of the master's degree in Contemporary Latin American Aesthetics hosted at the National University of Avellaneda (Argentina).

References

French psychoanalysts
Argentine psychoanalysts
1953 births
Living people
20th-century Argentine Jews
20th-century French Jews
21st-century Sephardi Jews
20th-century French philosophers
21st-century French philosophers
Anti-globalization activists